The Tanjung Rambutan railway station is a defunct Malaysian train station located at and named after the Tanjung Rambutan, Kinta District, Perak.

After the station was closed, the station is now a function as a food court.

External links
 Tanjung Rambutan Railway Station

Defunct railway stations in Malaysia
Kinta District